Spain will compete at the 2009 World Championships in Athletics from 15–23 August. A team of 51 athletes, 36 men and 16 women, was announced in preparation for the competition. Selected athletes have achieved one of the competition's qualifying standards. Included in the squad are 2007 World Championships race walk medallists Paquillo Fernández and María Vasco. Marta Domínguez, a 3000 metres steeplechase specialist, enters the competition as the world leader in her event.

Team selection

Track and road events

Field and combined events

Results

Men
Track and road events

Field events

Women
Track and road events

Field and combined events

References

External links
Official competition website

Nations at the 2009 World Championships in Athletics
Athletics
Spain at the World Championships in Athletics